The Arboretum d'Arpajon-sur-Cère (7 hectares) is an arboretum located on the Route de Labrousse, Arpajon-sur-Cère, Cantal, Auvergne, France. The arboretum was established in 1993, and now contains a variety of trees from around the world, including ash trees, maples, oaks, pines, and willows, as well as fruit trees and a labyrinth. It is open daily without charge.

See also 
 List of botanical gardens in France

References 
 Petit Futé description (French)
 Je Decouvre La France description (French)
 Cantal Passion description with photos (French)

Arpajon-sur-Cere, Arboretum d'
Arpajon-sur-Cere, Arboretum d'
1993 establishments in France